Artafallie is a hamlet on the Black Isle, in the Highland council area of Scotland.

Populated places on the Black Isle